Edean Anderson Ihlanfeldt, pronounced island-felt, (April 15, 1930 – April 27, 2020) was an American amateur golfer from Montana, coach and founder of the University of Washington women's varsity golf team, and one of the most successful female golfers in the Pacific Northwest. She won several amateur tournaments, including the Canadian Women's Amateur and the U.S. Senior Women's Amateur.

Early life and education 
Anderson began training at age 13; in 1944, at age 14, she won her first out of six consecutive Montana State Women's Amateur golf championships (1944–49), with a local outlet calling her a child prodigy. In 1949, Anderson moved to Corvallis, Oregon to attend Oregon State University, where she joined the sorority Alpha Phi. While there, she practiced with friend and fellow golfer Grace DeMoss, competing as both partners and opponents at times. Anderson would continue a streak of winning one major championship a year until 1954.  That year Anderson met her husband Robert Ihlanfeldt while playing golf. He proposed a week later, and the two were married in two months.

Career 
During the first two decades of her career after graduation, Ihlanfeldt won numerous tournaments: "five Pacific Northwest titles, the Washington state crown four times, the Trans-Mississippi championship, and the 1952 Canadian Open crown."

In 1974, Ihlanfeldt brought the U.S. Women's Amateur to Seattle and founded the women's varsity golf program at the University of Washington; she accepted no salary during the time she coached the team for the next eight years. In 1989, the University inducted her into its Hall of Fame.

In 1997 Ihlanfeldt, once again, brought the U.S. Senior Women's Amateur to Seattle.

Ihlanfeldt died April 27, 2020.

Amateur wins 
1944 Montana State Women's Amateur
1945 Montana State Women's Amateur
1946 Montana State Women's Amateur
1947 Montana State Women's Amateur
1948 Montana State Women's Amateur
1949 Montana State Women's Amateur, Pacific Northwest Women's Amateur
1951 Pacific Northwest Women's Amateur
1952 Canadian Women's Amateur
1953 Women's Trans-Mississippi Amateur
1961 Washington State Women's Amateur
1962 Pacific Northwest Women's Amateur, Washington State Women's Amateur
1963 Pacific Northwest Women's Amateur, Washington State Women's Amateur
1964 Pacific Northwest Women's Amateur
1975 Washington State Women's Amateur
1982 U.S. Senior Women's Amateur
1986 Pacific Northwest Senior Women's Amateur
1987 Pacific Northwest Senior Women's Amateur
1988 Pacific Northwest Senior Women's Amateur

References 

American female golfers
Amateur golfers
Golfers from Montana
Washington Huskies women's golf coaches
Oregon State University alumni
Sportspeople from Helena, Montana
1930 births
2020 deaths
21st-century American women